Julen Agirrezabala Astúlez (born 26 December 2000) is a Spanish professional footballer who plays as a goalkeeper for Athletic Bilbao.

Club career
Born in San Sebastián, Gipuzkoa, Basque Country, Agirrezabala joined Athletic Bilbao's youth setup in 2018, from Antiguoko. He made his senior debut with the farm team during the 2019–20 season, in Tercera División.

On his debut with the reserves on 1 November 2020, Agirrezabala started and saved a penalty kick in a 3–2 Segunda División B away win against Club Portugalete. The following 15 March, he renewed his contract until 2025.

In June 2021, Agirrezabala was called up by manager Marcelino to take part in the pre-season with the main squad. He made his first team – and La Liga – debut on 16 August, starting in a 0–0 away draw against Elche CF.

References

External links
 
 
 
 
 

2000 births
Living people
Footballers from San Sebastián
Spanish footballers
Association football goalkeepers
La Liga players
Primera Federación players
Segunda División B players
Tercera División players
Antiguoko players
CD Basconia footballers
Bilbao Athletic footballers
Athletic Bilbao footballers
Spain under-21 international footballers